Michael Gaston is an American film and television actor. He played agent Quinn on the show Prison Break, Gray Anderson on the CBS drama series Jericho, and appeared in the first episode of The Sopranos as Alex Mahaffey, a compulsive gambler in trouble with Tony. He had a recurring role in The Mentalist as CBI Director Gale Bertram.

Career 
Gaston portrayed General Tommy Franks in W. He has  appeared in more than twenty films, including Bridge of Spies, Sudden Death, Ransom, Cop Land, Thirteen Days, The Crucible, Double Jeopardy, High Crimes, Sugar and Body of Lies and Bless the Child. He has had roles in numerous TV dramas, including The Sopranos, The West Wing, Homicide: Life on the Street, Law & Order, Law & Order: Special Victims Unit, Fringe, The Practice, and 24.

Gaston has had various on and off Broadway roles, including A Day in the Death of Joe Egg (on Broadway), as well as Henry V, Landscape of the Body, and Fifty Ways (all Off Broadway).

Personal life 
Gaston has two children. His wife is the playwright and screenwriter Kate Fodor.

On October 10, 2017, during a wave of sexual assault allegations against several men in Hollywood, Gaston detailed in a series of tweets an incident in 1992 when the director of a play he was appearing in groped him sexually during a rehearsal. He stated "I give the benefit of what little doubt I have to any woman who claims a powerful man treated her inappropriately. Because it happened to me."

Filmography

Film

Television

References

External links 
 
 

American male film actors
American male television actors
Living people
Year of birth missing (living people)